Nathan Green may refer to:

Nathan "Nearest" Green (1820–?), emancipated slave and whiskey distiller
Nathan Green Sr. (1792–1866), justice of the Tennessee Supreme Court
Nathan Green Jr. (1827–1919), American educator and lawyer
Nathan Green (golfer) (born 1970), Australian golfer
Nathan Green (rugby league) (born 1992), Australian centre
Nathan Green (footballer) (born 1992), English footballer

See also
Nathan Greene (disambiguation)
Nathaniel Everett Green (1823–1899), English painter
Nate Green (born 1977), English footballer
Nate Green (author) (born 1985), author, writer, marketing strategist and fitness expert
Nathaniel Greene (disambiguation)
Nathan and Clarissa Green House, American historic home
Nathan Green Gordon (1916–2008), American lawyer and World War II soldier